Jose Luis Hernandez may refer to:

 José Luis Hernández (footballer), of the Mexican team Guerreros Fútbol Club
 José Luis Hernández (actor), of the 1951 Spanish film The Evil Forest
 Jose Luis Hernandez, a Cuban boxer who fought Vincenzo Nardiello in 1985